The TC's Trikes Coyote is an American ultralight trike that was designed by TC Blyth and produced by TC's Trikes of Soddy-Daisy, Tennessee. Originally known as the TC Trike, with the introduction of strut-braced Mustang wing the model became known as the Coyote.

Design and development
Early models feature a cable-braced hang glider-style high-wing, weight-shift controls, a single-seat or two-seats-in-tandem open cockpit, tricycle landing gear and a single engine in pusher configuration. Later Coyote models use the strut-braced North Wing Mustang wing made by North Wing Design.

The aircraft is made from bolted-together 6061-T6 aluminum and welded 4130 steel tubing, with its original TC Trikes Super D-16 single surface wing covered in Dacron sailcloth. The  area wing is supported by a single tube-type kingpost and uses an "A" frame control bar.

The standard engine supplied was the  twin cylinder, two-stroke, air-cooled Rotax 447, with the  Rotax 503 optional. The standard single seat can be replaced with a tandem seat for two occupants.

Variants
TC's Trike
Initial model with cable-braced TC's Trikes Super D-16 wing.
Coyote
Later model with strut-braced North Wing Mustang wing.

Specifications (TC's Trike)

References

1990s United States ultralight aircraft
Homebuilt aircraft
Single-engined pusher aircraft
Ultralight trikes